Jeremy Stine (born July 10, 1980) is an American businessman and politician who is a member of the Louisiana State Senate for the 27th district.

Early life and education
Stine was born on July 10, 1980 in Lake Charles, Louisiana. The Stine family is the owner of the Stine Lumber business, and Theresa Schmidt of KPLC describes the family as "well-known." Stine graduated from Louisiana State University with a degree in political science and French.

Career 
Stine was part of the first French language immersion program launched by the Council for the Development of French in Louisiana.

Stine has previously worked as a legislative aide. Stine is the marketing director of his family's business, Stine Lumber, and serves as the president of the Alliance for Positive Growth.

Louisiana State Senate 
On July 23, 2021, State Senator Ronnie Johns resigned to accept Governor John Bel Edwards’ appointment to the Louisiana Gaming Control Board. This left a vacancy in the 27th district seat. By July 26, Stine had announced his candidacy. Stine ran as a Republican. Two other candidates in the special primary ran to fill the vacancy: Republican Jake Shaheen and Democrat Dustin Granger. Granger is a financial planner and Shaheen is a school teacher. In the November 13 primary, Stine won the election outright, by receiving 59.2% of the vote. Stine plans to, during his swearing in ceremony, say the oath of office in both the English and French language.

Stine was described by Rachel Mipro of the Louisiana Illuminator as "anti-abortion, pro-gun rights and a supporter of the oil and gas industry."

Personal life
Stine and his wife, Emily, have three children.

References

Living people
Republican Party Louisiana state senators
Louisiana State University alumni
21st-century American businesspeople
21st-century American politicians
1980 births